The Danish Electricity Saving Trust (Elsparefonden) is an independent trust under the auspices of the Danish Ministry of Climate and Energy. The Trust works to promote energy savings and a more efficient use of electricity.

The Trust is financed by a special electricity savings charge of DKK 0.006/kWh payable by households and the public sector. Total annual proceeds amount to approximately DKK 96 million.

External links
 Savingtrust.dk

Energy in Denmark